The Lucian Blaga National Theatre (Romanian: Teatrul Național Lucian Blaga) in Cluj-Napoca, Romania is one of the most prestigious theatrical institutions in Romania. The theatre shares the same building with the Romanian Opera.

Building
The theatre was built between 1904 and 1906 by the famous Austrian architects Ferdinand Fellner and Hermann Helmer, who designed several theatres and palaces across Europe in the late 19th century and early 20th century, including the theatres in Iași, Oradea, Timișoara, and Chernivtsi. The project was financed using only private capital (Sandor Ujfalfy bequeathed his domains and estates from Szolnok-Doboka County to the National Theatre Fund from Kolozsvár).

The theatre opened on 8 September 1906 with Ferenc Herczeg's Bujdosók and until 1919, as Cluj was part of the Kingdom of Hungary, it was home to the local Hungarian National Theatre. The last performance of the Hungarian troupe was held on September 30, 1919 and presented Shakespeare's Hamlet: "Horatio, I am dead; / Thou livest; report me and my cause aright / To the unsatisfied."

Since 1919, when Cluj passed under Romanian administration, the building has been home to the local Romanian National Theatre and Romanian Opera, while the local Hungarian Theatre and Opera received the theatre building in Emil Isac street, close to the Central Park and the Someșul Mic River.

After the Second Vienna Award of 1940 and the annexation of Northern Transylvania by Hungary, the building was again the home of the Hungarian Theatre. On 31 October 1944 the Romanian and Hungarian actors celebrating the freedom of the city held a common performance, the revenue being donated to the Russian and Romanian wounded soldiers.

The hall has a capacity of 928 places, being conceived in the Neo-baroque style, with some inflexions inspired by the Secessionism in the decoration of the foyer.

The building of the National Theatre in Cluj-Napoca is listed in the National Register of Historic Monuments.

History

The Romanian National Theatre was officially opened on 18 September 1919, simultaneously with the Romanian Opera and the Gheorghe Dima National Music Academy. The inauguration performance, Poemul Unirei by Zaharia Bârsan, took place on 1 December 1919.

The founder of the National Theatre of Cluj, as well as his first director, was Zaharia Bârsan, actor, stage director, playwright and animator.

Between 1936 and 1940, the directorship of  meant a more profound opening towards modernity. In that period, a studio was created, in order to facilitate the contact of the public with the modern dramatic productions. Some famous actors of the time include Magda Tâlvan, Maria Cupcea, Titus Croitoru, Violeta Boitoș, Viorica Iuga, Nicolae Sasu, and Gheorghe Aurelian.

In 1940, as a result of the Second Vienna Award, the theatre, like other Romanian institutions, had to move to the Romanian part of the artificially divided Transylvania. While the local university moved to Sibiu, the national theatre moved to Timișoara. In December 1945, at the end of World War II, as Cluj became part of Romania once again, the theatrical institution returned to Cluj and restarted its activity, under the directorship of Aurel Buteanu.

Between 1948 and 1964, although under the initial stages of the Communist regime, the theatre remarkably managed to keep true to its artistic values.

After 1965, as Vlad Mugur became its director, the theatre focused on aesthetic values, refusing the ideological and moralising line imposed by the increasingly strict Communist authorities. The performances became based on a balanced type of Modernism. In this period the National Theatre established itself as an important European theatrical institution, due to the prestigious artistic tours in Italy with performances such as Iphigeneia in Tauris by Euripides, Caligula by Albert Camus, A Midsummer Night's Dream by William Shakespeare.

Famous artists of the time include Mihai Măniuțiu, Gelu Bogdan Ivașcu, Maria Munteanu, Ileana Negru, Miriam Cuibus, Marius Bodochi, Petre Băcioiu, and Dorin Andone. In this period, performances such as Săptămîna luminată by Mihail Săulescu, The Lesson by Eugène Ionesco, and Murder in the Cathedral by T. S. Eliot were staged during several tours in England, France, Yugoslavia, Finland, the United States, and Egypt.

After the Romanian Revolution of 1989, the performances became more diverse and modern. Famous names of this period include , Mihai Măniuțiu, Mona Chirilă, Anca Bradu, Theodor-Cristian  Popescu, Liviu Ciulei, Crin Teodorescu, Lucian Giurchescu, Mircea Marosin, Horea Popescu, Gheorghe Harag, and Dinu Cernescu. The directors of the theatre until 2000 were, successively, Victor Ioan Frunză, and Dorel Vișan.

Since 2011, the director of the Cluj-Napoca National Theatre has been Mihai Măniuțiu. The performances comprise original dramatic works (classic and modern, Romanian and universal). Important stage directors include Vlad Mugur, Mihai Măniuțiu, and Alexandru Dabija.

References

External links

 Official site

Theatres in Cluj-Napoca
National theatres
Buildings and structures in Cluj-Napoca
Baroque Revival architecture in Romania
Fellner & Helmer buildings
Event venues established in 1906
Culture in Cluj-Napoca
Tourist attractions in Cluj-Napoca
Art Nouveau architecture in Romania
Art Nouveau theatres
1906 establishments in Austria-Hungary
Historic monuments in Cluj County